The Time Runaways (Les évadés du temps) is Philippe Ebly's second series. Nine novels were published, one is unpublished. It was first printed in the Hachette Publishing collection "La Bibliothèque Verte" (The Green Library), then partially reprinted by Degliame Publishing. If the Fantastic Conquerors adventures are based on scientific facts, the stories from the Time Runaways relates to the supernatural romance.

The novels
The Three Gates (Les trois portes, 1977, Hachette, 2004, Degliame)
The Wanderer from Beyond (Le voyageur de l'au-delà, 1978, Hachette; 2004, Degliame)
Raiders of the Unknown (Volontaires pour l'inconnu, 1980, Hachette)
A Brother Found Ages Ago (Un frère au fond des siècles, 1981, Hachette)
Tiger Hunting in Correze (Chasse au tigre en Corrèze, 1983, Hachette)
The Two-Headed Beast (Le monstre aux deux têtes, 1984, Hachette)
Descent to the Unnamed Land (Descente au pays sans nom, 1985, Hachette)
Going Nowhere (Objectif nulle part, 1986, Hachette)
The Ten Days Skid (Les dix jours impossibles, 1988, Hachette)

The characters
Thierry : a funny and stubborn redhead teenager and his friend... 
Didier : who is a shy dark-haired teenager. The two guys were trekking in an old celtic forest in France when they got caught in a storm. They entered a strange inn, but took the wrong door to go back on the road. That how they got lost in the very strange land, where they met... 
Kouroun : a muscular young teenager that was left in a cave when he was a baby. Then he grew up in the land of Ganeom. The young man was asked to lead Thierry and Didier back to their homeland, but the final condition of their survival was that Kouroun would have to leave Ganeom with them. Once back on Earth, Thierry Didier and Kouroun were trapped in a strange place in the French Cevennes Mountains. In order to escape the mystical trap, they had to complete a circle of moon stones, so a creature from the underworld could access our world. And this creature was: 
Noim : a non human being that has travelled all through a demonic dimension. He assumed corporeal form by taking the body appearance and the wisdom of Didier, the voice, eyes and charisma of Thierry and the strength and stamina of Kouroun. Noim is a telepath and a sorcerer.

The next episode
According to the writer, the tenth novel should take place under the French king Louis The Eleventh reign. But the story has never been fully written.

Degliame
The Degliame Publishing reprint of the series began in September 2004. Unlike The Fantastic Conquerors Series reprint, the two first novels were released in the right order. The three next episodes were also to be released that way, but the publisher ceased all activities before this. The project was indeed nearly completed, as one can find the full covers scan of the never reprinted books on Degliame website.

Science fiction book series
French speculative fiction works
Belgian speculative fiction works